Aleksandr Vladimirovich Yatsko (born 18 November 1978) is a former Russian professional football player.

Club career
He played for FC Fakel Voronezh in the Russian Cup. He played  in the Russian Football National League for FC SKA Rostov-on-Don in 2007.

References

1978 births
Sportspeople from Volgograd
Living people
Russian footballers
Association football midfielders
FC Fakel Voronezh players
FC Salyut Belgorod players
FC SKA Rostov-on-Don players
FC Tekstilshchik Kamyshin players
FC Rotor Volgograd players
FC Olimpia Volgograd players